Ana Mercedes Pérez (1910, Puerto Cabello – 1994; pseudonym "Claribel") was a Venezuelan poet, writer, translator, journalist and diplomat.

Biography
She was the daughter of the Laran jurist and diplomat, José Eugenio Pérez, who served as the Venezuelan consul general in London, and as President of the House of Deputies.

Her poetry was characterized as being very feminine, punctuated with notes of rebellion and angst. Along with her journalist contemporaries such as Juana de Ávila, Teresa Troconis, Peregrino Pérez, Isabel Jimenez Arráiz de Díaz, Pérez was a defender of Ligia Parra Jahn in the Caracas newspaper.

Selected works
El charco azul (1931)
Iluminada soledad (1949)
La verdad inedita (1947)
Yo acuso a un muerto, defense of Ligia Parra Jahn (Caracas, 1951)

References

1910 births
1994 deaths
People from Puerto Cabello
Venezuelan women poets
Venezuelan women journalists
Venezuelan translators
Venezuelan diplomats
20th-century translators
20th-century Venezuelan poets
20th-century Venezuelan women writers